The Ruby Prince is a South Asian folktale, first published in the late 19th century by author Flora Annie Steel. The tale is a local form of the cycle of the Animal as Bridegroom or The Search for the Lost Husband, in that a woman marries a man of supernatural origin, loses him and must regain him.

Source
The tale was originally printed in the late 19th century and identified as a Punjabi tale. Later publications sourced it as from Pakistan.

According to Richard Carnac Temple, the tale was collected by author Flora Annie Steel from a Jaṭṭ boy of Dobuldan in Rohtak district.

Pakistani writer and poet Shafi Aqeel published another version of the tale, titled Laal Shahzada, in Urdu, which was translated into English as Prince Ruby by writer Ahmad Bashir.

Summary
While walking on the road, a Brahman finds a shining red ruby on the ground. He picks it up and pockets it into his garments. Feeling hungry, the Brahman enters a corn-merchant's shop and offers the ruby as payment for the food. The corn-merchant stuns at the sight of the ruby, clearly worth more than anything in his store, and suggests the Brahman takes it to the king.

The Brahman sells the ruby to the king for a lakh of rupees and goes on his merry way. The king then gives the ruby to the queen for safekeeping, and she hides it in a locked trunk. Twelve years later, the king decides to open up the casket to see his ruby, but a youth comes out of it. The king questions the youth about his appearance and the fate of the ruby. The youth answers he is the Ruby Prince, and that is the only answer he can give. The king then orders him to be exiled from the kingdom from this perceived affront.

In his wanderings, the Ruby Prince reaches a town, and sees an old woman crying. The old woman explains that their realm is menaced by an ogre, and this time her son is next to be sacrificed to the monster. The Ruby Prince decides to save the old woman's son and vanquish the ogre, and asks the old woman to lodge there for some time. The next day, he  rides his horse to the ogre's meeting spot, kills him, and impales the ogre's head on a spike to show the town the monster is dead. He then returns to the old woman's house to sleep some more.

The townspeople see the ogre's head and alert the king, who goes to the old woman's house, since it was her son's who was supposed to be the ogre's next victim. The old woman tells the king the ogre is dead and her son is safe, and that their saviour is sleeping in her house. The king enters the house and sees that the sleeping youth was the one he drove forth from the palace. He consults with his ministers, who advise him to give his daughter to the youth as a reward for killing the ogre.

The Ruby Prince and the king's daughter marry in a grand ceremony. Some time later, the princess keeps hearing the gossip of the female courtier about her having married a stranger from who-knows-where. Intrigued by her husband's origins, she asks the Ruby Prince about his past, his origins, but he refuses to divulge any information.

One day, the princess and the Ruby Prince are near a river side, and she is still questioning him about his previous life. The Ruby Prince steps in the water as the princess insists to know her husband's name. He slowly sinks into the water as his wife is still questioning him, until "a jewelled snake with a golden crown and ruby star" appears in the water, looks at the princess with a sorrowful expression, then disappears beneath the water.

The princess despairs at her decision, and offers a bushel of gold to anyone who can bring her information about her husband. Time passes and, without news of her husband, she grows ill, until one day a dancing-woman comes to the court. The dancing-woman tells her about a strange occurrence: while she was gathering sticks, she rested for a bit near a tree, after she woke up, she saw a bright light, then a sweeper came out of a snake-hole, a water-carrier sprinkling water on the ground, and two carpet-bearers; music began to play, as a procession came out of the hole, a youth of majestic appearance at the front, and among his retinue a man with a red star on the forehead who began to dance before the king.

The princess and the dancing-woman go to the tree and wait for the strange procession to come out of the snake-hole. The same servants come, prepare the way for the procession, and the king comes with his retinue. The princess recognizes her husband among the king's retinue by a red star he is wearing. The princess notices the Ruby Prince's wan aspect.

The dancing-girl explains her plan to the princess to save her husband: since the Snake-King is delighted at the dances, the princess should learn to dance, dance before the Snake-King in a way he is to be so impressed that he could grant anything. The princess is taught by the dancing-girl and surpasses her.

Finally, the princess returns to the tree and waits for the Snake-King's retinue. After they come, and the Snake-King forces the Ruby Prince to dance before him, the princess, wearing veiled garments and decorated with jewels, begins to dance before the King. So impressive are her dancing moves that the Snake King grants her a favor. The princess, then,  asks to be given the man for whom she danced. The Snake-King fumes at her answer and threatens to kill her, but remembers his promise and lets her take the Ruby Prince away from the retinue.

Analysis

Tale type
The tale was classified by scholar  as type ATU 425, "The Search for the Lost Husband", according to the international Aarne-Thompson-Uther Index. The tale was also said to "much resemble" the Graeco-Roman myth of Cupid and Psyche. In Stith Thompson and Warren Roberts's Types of Indic Oral Tales, the tale is classified under its own Indic type, 425D Ind, "Search for Serpent Husband".

Motifs
In his work about Cupid and Psyche and other Animal as Bridegroom tales, Swedish scholar  identified that, in certain tales, the heroine causes her supernatural husband's disappearance by inquiring his name. Swahn named this motif The Name Taboo and surmised that it occurred "primarily in India".

R. C. Temple noted that the protagonist's name, in the original language, is written La’ljí, meaning either "ruby" or "beloved, cherished".

According to Stith Thompson and  study of motifs of Indian literature and oral folklore, the tale contains the motif D432.3.1 "Transformation: ruby to person".

Variants

India

Manikkam and Moothiam
Author M. N. Venkataswami collected another Indian tale titled Manikkam and Moothiam. In this tale, a poor woodcutter laments his poor station in life: no parents, no child and a wife to care for. One day, he goes to the forest to gather wood and finds a dried tree. He uproots it and finds a diamond. The story then explains that Nagendra, the king of serpents, exiles his son to Naraloka for 20 years and casts a diamond off his head, his own son - the same diamond found by the woodcutter. The woodcutter brings the diamond home with him and sees that his luck changes for the better: he sells more firewood for better prices. After some time, the woodcutter, now rich, goes to check on the diamond and finds a baby. He and his wife decide to raise the baby as their own son. Ten years later, princess Moothiam ("pearl") goes to the patashala to learn the Kalas ("arts"), and so does the woodcutter's son, named Manikkam. After some years, the king thinks to himself that the princess has learned enough and decides to take her out of school so she can spend her days inside. Moothiam convinces Manikkam to elope. They make arrangements (some dresses and jewels), meet at the temple of Mahakal and depart on their horses.

Some time later, they rest by the house of an old woman, mother of seven robbers. A Komti passes by the robbers' hose and alters the pair about the robbers. The pair then makes their escape, but are pursued by the robbers. Moothiam shoots arrows at the robbers and kills all of them save one, whom they decide to spare and take as a groom. This leads to a fatal mistake: as soon as Manikkam says he wants to rest, he gives his scimitar to the last robber, who kills the youth. The robber in return, is killed by the princess, who mourns for her fallen friend. Deities Parwati and Parmeshwara heed her cries and descend to Earth as an old couple. Shiva senses that the youth is the son of the king of serpents and gives the princess a vibhudikaya to apply on his body to revive him. The princess does that and Manikkam comes back to life. The princess and the youth reach another city where they live together.

In this city, the king convinces Manikkam to marry Moothiam, so they set up a date for their wedding. However, a flower-woman, a witch, falls in love with Manikkam and turns him into a goat with an enchanted garland. Moothiam finds the sorceress, punishes her and marries Manikkam. The youth also marries the second king's daughter. Since his time in Naraloka is running out, and to expedite the process, Manikkam's mother goes to the human realm under human guise and sells some Gangaraingu pandlu fruit to them. Manikkam notices the fruit is from the serpent realm. The next day, the fruit seller tries to convince the women to eat some of his plate, knowing that her son's nails contain poison - a stratagem that also fails. The third time, the fruit seller induces both women to ask about their husband's origins. Manikkam tells her to go to the sea shore. Moothiam and people assemble near the sea-shore; Mannikam reveals he is the son of Nagaraja, turns into a large snake and dives into the sea, back to Nagaloka.

Moothiam swims after him, despite the force of the waves, and Manikkam, in snake form, catches his human wife and takes her to his father's garden. Manikkam gives her garments to wear and milk from the cosmic cow to eat, and recommends her to clean the way to a hillock of pebbles and thorns and prepare food and milk for his father when he comes. The father, noticing the kind action, shall grant her a boon. The first time, Moothiam trembles with fear before the king of snakes and forgets to ask for the boon. Some time later, Manikkam's snake wife learns that his human wife is in the serpent realm, and gives her a dirty rag smeared with oil to be washed clean as a conch-shell. Manikkam summons some cranes flying overhead and orders them to clean the piece of cloth. The snake-wife also gives her a pot full of holes and orders her to empty a well. Manikkam orders the little frogs to fill up the holes. The next time his father comes to the hillock, on the full moon, Moothiam still shakes with fear. The third time, she takes heart and asks Nagaraja for the diamond on his head. Nagendra gives her the diamond. Manikkam then takes Moothiam back to the human realm.

Hira and Lal 
In a Hindustani folktale titled Hira and Lal, a poor grass-cutter ventures in the jungle to cut grass to sell. He finds the carcass of a dead snake and next to it a shining ruby, or Lal. He decides to present the Raja with the ruby. The Raja gives the ruby to his wife, the Rani, for safekeeping, but the ruby turns into a baby. The royal couple decide to raise the baby and name him Lal ('ruby'). He goes to school and meets a princess named Hira ('diamond'), whom he falls in love with. After some time, Hira is set to be married to another Raja, and Lal's father wants him to cease all contact with her. Lal disobeys his orders and rides to Hira's wedding, and they elope on two horses to regions unknown. Some time later, Hira and Lal take shelter with an old woman, who is the wife and mother of a pair of robbers. The old woman's maidservant, in tears, tells the couple about the robbers and bids them escape. As soon as they flee the house, the father-son robbers ride behind them. Lal shoots an arrow behind him and kills the younger robber. Lal and Hira then reach a serai where they spend the night. The next morning, an old man seeks employment with the pair. They hire him.  Unbeknownst to them, the old man is the older robber. He kills Lal and threatens Hira, but she distracts him by making him look at a kite and kills him. Hira cries over the corpse of her beloved Lal, when Shiva and Parvati hear her lamentations. Shiva revives Lal with his blood and the human couple depart to another city. After some misadventures with a  sorceress that turns Lal into a goat and Hira saving a princess, Lal marries both Hira and the city's princess. Marital life is a blissful one, until one day, the princess suggests Hira to ask Lal about his origins. Lal goes near a stream and, the more Hira insists to know about his past, the deeper Lal enters the stream. After he is completely submerged, Lal becomes a giant black snake and slithers under the waves, leaving a bereft Hira crying at the river margin. Stith Thompson and  sourced this tale from Ganges Valley.

Sakhi-sonā 
Bengali writer and folklore researcher Dinesh Chandra Sen reported a "Muhammadam version" of Sakhi-sonā, collected from an informant named Muhammad Korban Ali. In this tale, in Taef, a poor man named Syed lives with his nagging wife. Intent on getting rid of her, he finds a poisonous cobra, places it into an earthen pot and brings it home. Syed gives the pot to his wife. Late at night, the man's wife opens up the pot and finds not a cobra, but gold coins. Syed's wife is very pleased, and Syed lies that he earned them with his good work. his wife goes to the local Badsha and sells the gold coins to the Begum for a 1,000 rupees. The Begum keeps the coins in a safe and goes to show her husband the next day, but, instead of the coins, they find a baby girl. The Badsha and the Begum announce they have a daughter, and a great celebration is held in their homage. At the same time, the Uzir's household also celebrates the birth of their son, whom they name Mānik.

The Badsha and Begum's daughter, called Sakhi-sonā, is prophesied to elope with a man after she reaches womanhood. She and the Manik read in the same Mokhtab, and grow to love each other as they grow up. They begin to meet in secret, until a maidservant warns them they might be discovered, so they need to escape. Sakhi-sonā disguises herself in masculine attire and, joined by Manik, flees from their city. The pair rides far away through the jungle until they reach a cottage that belongs to an old woman, who is the mother of seven dacoits.

A servant of the old woman warns the pair that the old woman's seven sons will come home ro rob them. Sakhi-sonā and Manik escape, but, unknowingly, leave a trail of seeds for the seven daicots to follow - a trick by the old woman. The seven daicots follow the pair, intent on attacking them. Manik kills six of the daicots, but spares the seventh, a lame one, and takes him in as their horse-keeper.

However, the seventh daicot begins to harbour feelings towards Sakhi-sonā, and plots to kill Manik. He seizes the opportunity when Manik is asleep and Sakhi-sonā is doing some chores in the kitchen. The daicot beheads Manik and Sakhi-sonā avenges him by killing the daicot. Sakhi-sonā cries over her loss, and a pir (saint) revives him.

Sakhi-sonā and a resurrected Manik pass by the cottage of a flower-seller  named Champa, who, in turn, falls in love with Manik and turns him into a monkey to have him for herself. Sakhi-sonā notice his absence, but journeys on to another city with their horses. Some of the royal guards arrests Sakhi-sonā, thinking she is the thief that stole two horses some time before.

Sakhi-sonā is thrown in prison, while a giant snake appears to threaten the city. In her dreams, a pir appears and reveals the snake's weakness. Sakhi-sonā tells the king she can defeat the serpent. The king releases her from prison, and she kills the serpent. In gratitude, the king marries Sakhi-sonā to his daughter. The king's daughter, however, suspects something amiss with her "husband". Meanwhile, Manik, in monkey form, writes letters to the palace, addressed to his beloved Sakhi-sonā,  telling of his captivity in the flower-seller's power. Sakhi-sonā asks the king to buy her the monkey from the flower-seller. At night, the monkey turns back into Manik and tells her everything. The king punishes the flower seller, and marries his daughter to Manik, after learning that Sakhi-sonā is a woman. Manik lives with his two wives.

Other tales 
Professor Sadhana Naithani published a tale collected from a student in Jwálápur. In this tale, a Jat and a Gujar are friends. One day, the Jat buys an earthen pot and places a snake inside it. He gives the pot to his wife and she puts it on the oven. She opens it and finds a garland of rubies. The Jat decides to sell the garland to the Rajá. The Rajá takes it and places it in a cot, and, the next morning, a baby appears in the place of the garland. The Rajá and his wife, the Rani, deduce that the rubies have turned into a boy. Twelve years later, they decide to marry the boy, named Prince Lal, to a girl "born of a diamond", but evil viziers kill the Rajá to usurp his kingdom. The Rani escapes with the boy to another kingdom. Prince Lal becomes friends with a girl named Hira Princess at school. The boy and the princess elope and ride two horses to regions unknown, and stop to rest at the house of a family of "free booters". Prince Lal kills the 14 booters. Their father, in revenge, wears a disguise and offers to be the duo's syce. The false syce cuts off the prince's head and Hira Princess, in retaliation, kills him. She cries for her fallen friend. Her pleas are heard by Párbati and Mahadeva. Mahadeva tells the princess to use her blood to revive him. Prince Lal comes back to life, goes to his father's kingdom and fights the usurpers to regain the kingdom.

Pamir Mountains 
Russian philologist Aleksandr Gryunberg-Tsvetinovich and philologist  collected a tale from the Wakhi people with the title "Шохзодалал и Дурбону" ("Shohzodalal and Durbonu"). In this tale, a king has ten wives, but no son yet. One day, a servant of the first wife finds a ruby in the river and brings it to the queen. The queen dismisses as another ruby that can be found in the king's treasury and places it on a shelf. Some time later, the ruby becomes a human baby that the queen passes off as her own son and introduces him to the king. The story explains that the ruby was actually a boy whose mother is a div and father belongs to the pari race. Around the same time, the king's vizier's wife gives birth to a daughter. They decide to name the boy Shohzodalal and the girl Durbonu, and promise to marry their children to each other when they are of age. Shohzodalal and Durbonu are taught together at school. They become friends and fall in love with each other. Due to their closeness, their mother decide that both Shohzodalal and Durbonu are to be skilled in martial affairs. After their studies, the vizier breaks his vow and betroths Durbonu to a foreign prince. Durbony writes a letter to Shohzodalal, announcing her intentions to elope with him. They ride their horses to another kingdom, and stop by a house where a div family lives. They escape from the divs and kill the seven div sons. The div-mother disguises herself as a human old woman and kills Shohzodalal, and Durbonu, in revenge, decapitates the old woman. Durbonu grieves for her fallen friend for 30 days, until a man in green robes appears to her. The man tells Durbonu to get water from a certain fountain, which revives Shohzodalal. In another kingdom, Durbonu, disguised as a male soldier, rescues princess Nurbonu from a dragon. Nurbonu's father officiates Shohzodalal's marriage to both Durbonu and Nurbonu. Some time later, Shohzodalal's mother hatches a plan to separate her son from his human wives: disguising herself as an old woman, she visits Durbonu and Nurbonu, and convinces Durbonu to ask Shohzodalal about his true parentage. After Shohzodalal arrives home, Durbonu asks him to tell her of his real parents. The man agrees to her request, but warns that it will only bring them misfortune. Shohzodalal takes Durbinu to the garden and goes into the water. Durbonu insists he tells about his past, as the man sinks into the water until he disappears. Durbonu tells Nurbonu to convince her father to build an inn outside the city, where Durbonu will give alms to the poor. One day, an old man and his grandson are looking for their cow, and venture into the woods. They climb a tree and see a retinue come out of the river: an ugly woman comes and begs for a man named Shohzodalal to dance before her. The old man and the grandson tell the story to Durbonu. Durbonu gets a sleeping potion from Nurbonu and goes to the river margin to wait for Shohzodalal. The div retinue comes out of the river. As Shohzodalal dances, Durbonu tosses him her ring to let him know she is there. After deceiving his mother, Shohzodalal climbs up the tree where Durbonu is, and plots with her to get rid of his div mother once and for all. In their notes, Gryunberg-Tsvetinovich and Steblin-Kamensky explained that the hero's name, "Shohzodalal", was translated as "Prince Lal", "lal" meaning 'ruby', while the heroine's name, "Durbonu", meant 'lady pearl'.

See also
Tulisa, the Wood-Cutter's Daughter
 The Tale of the Woodcutter and his Daughters
The Golden Crab
Princess Himal and Nagaray
The Snake Prince
Champavati

Footnotes

References 

Asian fairy tales
Fictional princes
Male characters in fairy tales
Female characters in fairy tales
Fiction about shapeshifting
ATU 400-459
Gemstones in culture